Biography 

Cyprien Tokoudagba (1939 - 5 May 2012) was a sculptor from Abomey, Benin.

He started to work as a restorer for the Abomey Museum in 1987, when he was hired to replicate the original bas-reliefs that told many of Dahomey's legends and stories while celebrating the individual kings  for the new King Glelé royal palace façade, among the Royal Palaces of Abomey reconstructed by the government of Benin.

Tokoudagba continued the tradition of bas-relief though the use of cement and commercially available synthetic paint, while also producing works on canvas, frescoes and monumental sculptures. In 1989, Cyprien left Benin for the first time to exhibit at “Magiciens de la Terre” in Paris, France.
Tokoudagba's work was exhibited at the "Ouidah '92" festival, which celebrated Vodun art from Benin and the African Diaspora in Ouidah, Benin in February 1993.
His works have also been exhibited in the following museums: Smithsonian institution - National Museum of African Art, Washington, DC; Musée Dapper, Paris, France; Museum Kunst Palast, Düsseldorf, Germany; Hayward Gallery, London, Englands; Centre Georges Pompidou, Paris, France; Mori Art Museum, Tokyo, Japan; São Paulo Biennale, Brasil.

References

1939 births
2012 deaths
Male sculptors
People from Abomey
20th-century Beninese sculptors
21st-century sculptors
Voodoo artists
20th-century male artists
21st-century male artists